Helena is an unincorporated community and census-designated place (CDP) in Newberry County, South Carolina, United States. It was first listed as a CDP prior to the 2020 census with a population of 870.

The CDP is in central Newberry County bordered to the east by the city of Newberry, the county seat. South Carolina Highway 121 (Kendall Road) runs north-south through Helena, connecting with U.S. Route 76 north of Newberry and with South Carolina Highway 34 southwest of Newberry.

Demographics

2020 census

Note: the US Census treats Hispanic/Latino as an ethnic category. This table excludes Latinos from the racial categories and assigns them to a separate category. Hispanics/Latinos can be of any race.

References 

Census-designated places in Newberry County, South Carolina
Census-designated places in South Carolina